José Luis Ugarte was born Guecho, Spain on the 6 November 1928   and died on the 27 July 2008 was a Spanish sailor he compete is the second Vendée Globe Race finishing 6th 1992–1993 Vendée Globe at 64 he was oldest competitor at that time a fact broken by Rich Wilson (USA) in the 2016 race at the age of 66.

References 

1928 births
2008 deaths
IMOCA 60 class sailors
Spanish male sailors (sport)
Vendée Globe finishers
1992 Vendee Globe sailors
Spanish Vendee Globe sailors
Single-handed circumnavigating sailors
Sportspeople from Biscay
Sportspeople from Getxo
Sailors (sport) from the Basque Country (autonomous community)